Ingram station is a below grade busway station operated by Pittsburgh Regional Transit in Ingram, Pennsylvania. The station is located on the West Busway and is served by routes 28X, G2, G3 and G31. The station is located slightly below grade as the Berry Street Tunnel is located just north of the station.

The station is the only station on the busway without a park and ride lot nearby.

References

Port Authority of Allegheny County stations
Bus stations in Pennsylvania
West Busway